Vehement may refer to:

The pronunciation of VHEMT, which is the Voluntary Human Extinction Movement
, the name of more than one ship of the British Royal Navy